Plumstead is an area in southeast London, within the Royal Borough of Greenwich, England. It is located east of Woolwich.

History

In 960 King Edgar gave four plough lands, collectively called Plumstead, to a monastery - St Augustine's Abbey near Canterbury, Kent. These were subsequently taken from the monastery by Earl Godwin for his fourth son, Tostig.

King Edward the Confessor restored them again to the monastery on taking power, however Tostig saw the opportunity to take possession of them once again after Edward's death in 1066 when King Harold seized his brother's estates.

After the Battle of Hastings in 1066, William the Conqueror gifted Plumstead to his half-brother Odo, Bishop of Bayeux, whom he also titled Earl of Kent. The Archbishop of Canterbury Lanfranc of Pavia and the Norman abbot of St Austin's successfully interceded to reclaim a portion of the land on behalf of the monastery. In 1074 Odo then granted by deed the remainder of the parish and also the right of the abbot to be "Chief Lord of the Fee".

However, the Domesday Book of 1086 holds the details of Plumstead as two separate entries. Under the title of the land of the church of St. Augustine it reads 
"In Litelai hundred. The abbot of St. Augustine has 1 manor, named Plumstede, which was taxed at 2 sulings and 1 yoke. The arable lands is ... In demesne there is 1 carucate and 17 villeins, with 6 cottagers, having 6 carucates, there is wood for the pannage of 5 hogs. In the time of king Edward the Confessor, and afterwards it was worth 10 pounds, now 12 pounds, and yet it pays 14 pounds and 8 shillings and 3 pence."
while under the general title of the Bishop of Baieux's lands
"The abbot of St. Augustine holds of the bishop of Baieux, Plumsted. It was taxed at 2 sulings and 1 yoke. The arable land is 5 carucates. In demesne there is 1 carucate and 17 villeins, with 3 boarderers, having 4 carucates. There is wood for the pannage of 5 hogs. In the time of king Edward the Confessor it was worth 10 pounds, when he received it 8 pounds, and now as much, and yet he who holds it pays 12 pounds. Brixi Cilt held it of king Edward."

Around this time Reginald, son of Gervase de Cornhill, released to the abbot and convent all claims in this manor from David and Robert de Cornhill who had rented it from them.

By 1273 Nicholas de Spina was elected abbot of the monastery and by the following year he was receiving eleven pounds from Plumstead residents.

It appears that Robert, the last abbot but one, had recovered a share of this land from her ancestor, Richard de Ros. It was found by a jury of grand assizes that his ancestors held this land in tenancy from the abbot and convent at a rent of twelve pound per annum.

In 1314, during the reign of Edward II of England, the abbot was summoned before Hervey de Stanton, the Chancellor of the Exchequer. He was asked to show by what right he claimed sundry liberties and free warren on the manor of Plumstead amongst others. Other questions included the right for a weekly market in Plumstead on a Wednesday and a fair yearly for three days "on the Eve day, and morrow of St. Nicholas".

For reasons that remain unclear, King Edward III exempted the men and tenants of the manor of Plumstead from providing four men from the borough for the sheriff as was the requirement elsewhere. A writ to Roger de Reynham, Sheriff of Kent, in 1332 directed and commanded him that the residents of Plumstead should be allowed to send one man only. By 1363 Edward also decreed to the monastery in his charter of infpeximus that he released all manors and possessions given to it by former kings, including William the Conqueror. He also confirmed all the grants of liberties previously bestowed on the abbot and monastery.

By the time of Richard II of England the taxes from Plumstead were valued at 69 pounds, 10 shillings and sixpence, and Henry VI of England reconfirmed the liberties and rights of the monastery.

Plumstead manor, together with the church of Plumstead and the chapel of Wickham annexed to it, remained part of the possessions of the monastery until its final dissolution in 1539, the 30th year of the reign of Henry VIII, when the abbey and all its revenues were surrendered into the King's hands by the then abbot, John Essex, and its thirty members.

Plumstead expanded rapidly in the 1880s with housing developed for workers at the Royal Arsenal; two-up two-down terraced housing was common in the area close to the river and the Arsenal, whereas larger and smarter properties were developed uphill from the Thames, around Plumstead Common. The 1878 Plumstead Common Act protected Plumstead Common as public open space forever. In the late 19th century, Woolwich cemetery was developed in two phases (1856, 1855) on land formerly part of the southern edge of the Common.

Plumstead was also the home of the Peculiar People and an account of this Protestant sect is recorded in 'Unorthodox London' by the journalist Charles Maurice Davies. The Plymouth Brethren have had numerous meeting rooms in the area since about 1845. The present Brethren meeting places are at Plum Lane (1865), Willenhall Road (ca 1910) and Brewery Road (Richmond Gospel Hall). Quakers met nearby in Woolwich from 1905, and in their own Meeting House from 1924.

Plumstead had rapid housing growth but still retained large areas of green land i.e. Winns Common, Plumstead Common, Shrewsbury Park and Rockcliffe Gardens. The urban sprawl of lower Plumstead adjacent to Woolwich was not initially matched by upper Plumstead.

Education

Plumstead Manor School is located in the area. The school was first established as Plumstead County School for Girls in 1913, and was later renamed Kings Warren Grammar School before becoming a comprehensive school in 1967. The school was a girls school until September 2018, after which it began accepting students of all genders.

There are a number of primary schools in Plumstead including St. Patricks RC Primary School, St. Margaret's CofE Primary School, Gallions Mount Primary School, Timbercroft Primary School, Bannockburn Primary School, Plumcroft Primary School, Greenslade Primary School, South Rise Primary School, and Conway Primary School.

Sport
Arsenal Football Club (then known as Royal Arsenal or Woolwich Arsenal) played in Plumstead between 1886 and 1913, at various grounds in the Plumstead area, but mainly at the Manor Ground, on the north side of Plumstead Common Road and the Invicta Ground, where the Royal Ordnance Factories F.C. also played.

Transport

Rail
Plumstead railway station serves the area with National Rail services to London Charing Cross via Lewisham, London Cannon Street via Greenwich, London Cannon Street via Bexleyheath, London Cannon Street via Sidcup, Kentish Town via Greenwich, Dartford and Rainham.

Buses
Plumstead is served by many bus routes provided by Transport for London. These connect Plumstead with other areas including Bexleyheath, Central London, Crystal Palace, Dartford, Eltham, Erith, Greenwich, Lewisham, New Cross, Orpington, Peckham, Sidcup, Thamesmead, Welling and Woolwich.

Notable people

Notable people from Plumstead include:
Ethel Edith Bilsland, composer, soprano and pianist
Michael Bradshaw, actor
Charlie Buchan, footballer and writer
Mason Burstow, footballer
John Carnell, science fiction magazine editor
Stephen Lawrence, victim of a racially motivated homicide
George Chakravarthi, artist
Ernest Clark, Governor of Tasmania .
Charlie Collier, motorcycle racer
Steve Davis, snooker player
Tanya Franks, actress
Fred Hammill, trade unionist
Kevin Horlock, footballer
Marvin Humes, member of X-Factor finalist boy band, JLS
Malvin Kamara, footballer
Scott Maslen, television actor 
Taiwo Owatemi, MP for Coventry North West
Lee Ryan, of boy band Blue
Tinie Tempah, rapper
Nina Toussaint-White, television actress
Paul Walsh, footballer 
Bill Whitehouse, Formula 1 racing driver
Shampoo, Pop duo

Notable people buried in Plumstead Cemetery include:

William Bennet (bishop), Bishop of Cloyne, Ireland, was buried in Plumstead in 1820, before the local cemeteries were established.
Thomas Flawn VC (22 December 1857 - 19 January 1925)
Edwin Hughes MP (27 May 1832 – 15 September 1904)
Alfred Smith VC (1861 - 6 January 1932)

Nearby areas
 Abbey Wood
 Belvedere
 Blackheath
 Charlton
 East Wickham
 Greenwich
 Shooters Hill
 Thamesmead
 Welling
 West Heath
 Woolwich
Bexleyheath

Gallery

References

External links
 Greenwich Council
 Greenwich Young Peoples Council

Districts of the Royal Borough of Greenwich
Areas of London
Former civil parishes in the Royal Borough of Greenwich
District centres of London